Orsago is a comune (municipality) in the Province of Treviso in the Italian region Veneto, located about  north of Venice and about  northeast of Treviso.

Orsago borders the following municipalities: Cordignano, Gaiarine, Godega di Sant'Urbano.

Important buildings:

1- Villa Sbrojavacca - Maffei, 18th century. This construction was built by the Sbrojavacca nobles in the 18th century, but presents also some older elements such as the boundary walls surrounding the construction being the first site for cellars and barns, with rectangular openings as a range of loop-holes. The villa was purchased by Maffei Marconi in 1835 and afterwards passed to the Zanin family of Orsago.

2.- Villa Priuli - Chastonay, 17th century. By crossing the large entrance gateway, with columns adorned by white stone swirls and statues, and following the pathway, you come upon a second gateway having the statues of Ercole and Prometeo. The villa is majestic, with an elevated central body.

Demographic evolution

References

Cities and towns in Veneto